Catholic social teaching, commonly abbreviated CST, is an area of Catholic doctrine concerning matters of human dignity and the common good in society. The ideas address oppression, the role of the state, subsidiarity, social organization, concern for social justice, and issues of wealth distribution. Its foundations are widely considered to have been laid by Pope Leo XIII's 1891 encyclical letter Rerum novarum, which advocated economic distributism. Its roots can be traced to the writings of Catholic theologians such as St. Thomas Aquinas and St. Augustine of Hippo. It is also derived from concepts present in the Bible and cultures of the ancient Near East.

According to Pope John Paul II, the foundation of social justice "rests on the threefold cornerstones of human dignity, solidarity and subsidiarity". According to Pope Benedict XVI, its purpose "is simply to help purify reason and to contribute, here and now, to the acknowledgment and attainment of what is just... [The church] has to play her part through rational argument and she has to reawaken the spiritual energy without which justice ... cannot prevail and prosper." Pope Francis, in the words of Cardinal Walter Kasper, made mercy "the key word of his pontificate, ... (while) Scholastic theology has neglected this topic and turned it into a mere subordinate theme of justice."

Catholic social teaching is distinctive in its consistent critiques of modern social and political ideologies both of the left and of the right, such as liberalism, communism, anarchism, feminism, atheism, socialism, fascism, capitalism, and Nazism, which have all been condemned, at least in their pure forms, by several popes since the late nineteenth century.

Catholic social doctrine has always tried to find an equilibrium between respect for human liberty, including the right to private property and subsidiarity, and concern for the whole society, including the weakest and poorest. It is explicitly both anti-capitalist and anti-socialist, with John Paul II stressing the incompability of Catholic doctrine with capitalism:

History
The principles of Catholic social doctrine have their roots in the social teachings of the New Testament, the Church Fathers, and the Old Testament and Hebrew scriptures generally. The Church responded to historical conditions in Medieval and Early Modern Europe with philosophical and theological teachings on social justice considering the nature of man, society, economy, and politics. In the era of mass politics and industrialization, Catholic social teaching needed to account for what was called "the social question" but which covered the complex conflicts arising with modernization: social dislocation, economic suffering, and political turbulence. From the early 19th century, many and various Catholic thinkers responded to the revolutionary tide that the French Revolution and Napoleonic Era inaugurated. But by mid-century a new synthesis of Catholic natural law philosophy, mainly influenced by the writings of St. Thomas Aquinas, combined with the new social sciences of politics and economy, was embraced by the Vatican. It took several decades for this synthesis to become established in Catholic social teaching. Pope Leo XIII in a series of encyclicals spanning 20 years formalized the modern approach to Catholic social teaching, that combines evangelical teachings on the duties to love one another with natural law social scientific arguments on the requirements of human flourishing. These combined principles have been reiterated by subsequent popes, consistently over the subsequent century and more.

Rerum novarum

The encyclical 
The publication of Leo XIII's encyclical Rerum novarum on 15 May 1891 marked the beginning of the development of a recognizable body of social teaching in the Catholic Church. It was written at a time when the previously agrarian population of Italy and western Europe were undergoing rapid urbanisation in the newly industrialized cities with many living in conditions of squalor and poverty. Similar trends took place in the Americas. Leo's predecessor, Pius IX, had seen the end of the church's control of the lands of the Papal States and had become isolated in the Vatican. Pius had railed against the unification of Italy during the Risorgimento and this cause had consumed his time in the last years of his pontificate; he had lost the faith of the Romans leading to them voting to incorporate into the newly integrated Italy in 1870. Writers have commented that Leo, upon taking up office as pope and shorn of the role as temporal ruler of three million mainly rural subjects, saw that the newly created industrial working class was the responsibility of the church and that Rerum novarum was a response to competition of ideas in the communist analysis of the social conditions facing the poor of industrialization through such books as Das Kapital and The Communist Manifesto. The opening phrases of Rerum novarum state "that some opportune remedy must be found quickly for the misery and wretchedness pressing so unjustly on the majority of the working class... so that a small number of very rich men have been able to lay upon the teeming masses of the laboring poor a yoke little better than that of slavery itself."

But Leo wanted to reject the solutions offered by communism in that "those who deny these rights [private ownership] do not perceive that they are defrauding man of what his own labor has produced." He declared a "most sacred law of nature" that humans have the right of private ownership of inheritable property and provision of "all that is needful to enable them to keep themselves decently" for his children. The "main tenet of socialism, community of goods, must be utterly rejected".

He disputed one of the central ideas of communism that class war was inevitable and that rich and poor classes were inexorably driven to conflict. Instead he stressed the need for justice to be central to the relationship with religion and the church as the most powerful intermediary to achieve that justice and the peace from strife that would accompany it.

That justice relied on equality between rich and poor and extended throughout all citizens of a country. It embodied but went beyond the principle that "the interests of all, whether high or low, are equal" to include the demand that the "public administration must duly and solicitously provide for the welfare and the comfort of the working classes".

He went further by elevating the family unit from any idea of serfdom and pure economic interest or collectivism by placing the interests, moral authority and importance of the family as being "at least equal rights with the State". The state, he wrote, would be guilty of a "pernicious error" if it exercised any intimate control of a family unit but that "extreme necessity be met by public aid" when a family was in such need. The pre-eminence of the needs, protection and independence of a family unit was central to the teaching of the encyclical.

For the working relationship he stressed the equity of the relationship between the employer and employee. There must, he wrote, be balance between "respect in every man his dignity as a person" and proper performance of "the work which has been freely and equitably agreed upon". He concluded that "capital cannot do without labor, nor labor without capital".

Where the rights of the poor or the working person are in jeopardy, rights including working conditions and over-heavy burdens laced upon them, he wrote, they must be especially protected since the rich and powerful have many other means to protect their interests. The state, he argued, must legislate to protect workers from low pay, over-long working hours or over-taxing work and avail themselves of the protection provided by membership of trade unions.

Reaction to the encyclical 
The encyclical was followed in areas of Italy with the creation of social movements that expressed and campaigned for the alleviation of social concerns in local areas. Members of the church supported and became involved in campaigns in support of working people including contributions of personal money for those causes. The plight of cotton workers was an example of such causes and financial and moral support for a strike that started on 22 September 1909 in Bergamo (known as he "fifty day strike") was provided by local bishop Giacomo Maria Radini-Tedeschi and Father Angelo Roncalli (future Pope John XXIII) who saw in it the need for "pastoral modernity" in the Church.

Such support for social movements became unpopular, however, when Pope Pius X replaced Leo in 1903. Catholic involvement in Italian political life had been banned under previous popes and Pius allowed a network of spies to operate which identified and reported on the support for social and political movements and subjected them to questions, apostolic visits and pressure to desist.

Rerum novarum dealt with persons, systems and structures, the three co-ordinates of the modern promotion of justice and peace, now established as integral to the church's mission. In the years which followed there have been numerous encyclicals and messages on social issues; various forms of Catholic action developed in different parts of the world; and social ethics taught in schools and seminaries. To mark the 40th anniversary of Rerum novarum, Pope Pius XI issued Quadragesimo anno, which expanded on some of its themes.

Pope John XXIII
Further development came in the post–Second World War period when attention turned to the problems of social and economic development and international relations. On 15 May 1961 Pope John XXIII released Mater et magistra, subtitled "Christianity and Social Progress". This encyclical expanded the church's social doctrine to cover the relations between rich and poor nations, examining the obligation of rich countries to assist poor countries while respecting their particular cultures. It includes an examination of the threat of global economic imbalances to world peace. In it, the pope linked the establishment of world peace to the laying of a foundation consisting of proper rights and responsibilities between individuals, social groups, and states from the local to the international level. He exhorted Catholics to understand and apply the social teachings:

This document, issued at the height of the Cold War, also included a denunciation of the nuclear arms race and a call for strengthening the United Nations.

Second Vatican Council
The primary document from the Second Vatican Council concerning social teachings is Gaudium et spes, the "Pastoral Constitution on the Church and the Modern World", which is considered one of the chief accomplishments of the council. Unlike earlier documents, this is an expression of all the bishops, and covers a wide range of issues of the relationship of social concerns and Christian action. At its core, the document asserts the fundamental dignity of each human being, and declares the church's solidarity with both those who suffer, and those who would comfort the suffering:

Other conciliar documents such as Dignitatis humanae, drafted largely by John Courtney Murray, an American Jesuit, have important applications to the social teachings of the church on freedom today.

Pope Paul VI
Like his predecessor, Pope Paul VI gave attention to the disparities in wealth and development between the industrialized West and the Third World in his 1967 encyclical Populorum progressio (The Development of Peoples). It asserts that free international trade alone is not adequate to correct these disparities and supports the role of international organizations in addressing this need. Paul called on rich nations to meet their moral obligation to poor nations, pointing out the relationship between development and peace. The intention of the church is not to take sides, but to be an advocate for basic human dignity:

The May 1971 apostolic letter Octogesima adveniens addressed the challenge of urbanization and urban poverty and stressed the personal responsibility of Christians to respond to injustice. For the tenth anniversary of the Second Vatican Council (26 October 1975), Paul issued Evangelii nuntiandi (Evangelization in the Modern World). In it he asserts that combating injustice is an essential part of evangelizing modern peoples.

Pope John Paul II

Pope John Paul II continued his predecessors' work of developing the body of Catholic social doctrine. Of particular importance were his 1981 encyclical Laborem exercens and Centesimus annus in 1991.

While not endorsing any particular political agenda, the church holds that this teaching applies in the public (political) realm, not only the private.

Laborem exercens qualifies the teaching of private ownership in relation to the common use of goods that all men, as children of God, are entitled to. The church "has always understood this right within the broader context of the right common to all to use the goods of the whole creation: the right to private property is subordinated to the right to common use, to the fact that goods are meant for everyone." Many of these concepts are again stressed in Centesimus annus, issued on the occasion of the 100th anniversary of Rerum novarum, which encompasses a critique of both socialism and unfettered capitalism. Another major milestone under John Paul II's papacy occurred in 2005, with the publication of the Compendium of the Social Doctrine of the Church, a work entrusted to the Pontifical Council for Justice and Peace.

Pope Benedict XVI
 
Pope Benedict XVI's 2009 encyclical Caritas in veritate added many additional perspectives to the social teaching tradition, including in particular relationships with the concepts of Charity and Truth, and introduced the idea of the need for a strong "World Political Authority" to deal with humanity's most pressing challenges and problems. This idea has proven to be controversial and difficult to accept, particularly by right-of-center U.S. Catholic thinkers who are generally suspicious, or even disdainful, of supranational and international organizations, such as the United Nations. The concept was further developed in a 2011 note issued by the Pontifical Council for Justice and Peace entitled "Towards reforming the International Financial and Monetary Systems in the context of World Political Authority".

In Caritas in veritate, Benedict also lifted up Paul VI's social encyclical Populorum progressio, setting it as a new point of reference for Catholic social thought in the 21st century. Noted scholar Thomas D. Williams wrote that "by honoring Populorum progressio with the title of 'the Rerum novarum of the present age,' Benedict meant to elevate Populorum Progressio, conferring on it a paradigmatic status not dissimilar to that enjoyed by Rerum novarum throughout the twentieth century." Williams claims that the reason for this elevation is that Populorum progressio, "for all its real deficiencies, effected an important conceptual shift in Catholic social thinking, by moving from the worker question (with its attendant concerns of just wages, private property, working environment, and labor associations) to the broader and richer social benchmark of integral human development."

Pope Benedict has also been a critic of capitalism, characterizing it as a system that recognizes no duties or obligations towards human beings, and credits it with creating a destructive type of individualism which "encourages selfishness, as men are concerned exclusively with what they should receive from society and unconcerned with what they can or should contribute to it." According to Benedict, Catholic teaching recognizes common good as key requirement to prosperity, whereas capitalism disregards it for pursuit of profit, leading to exploitation and erosion of moral limitations. Benedict also expressed concern with the role of charity in capitalism, criticizing capitalism for its indifference towards charity and discouraging interest in others in favor of self-interest. Lastly, Pope Benedicts blames capitalism for growing sense of alienation and anomie in modern societies. Benedict points to the prevalence of drugs, alcohol, and
“deceptive illusions of happiness” as evidence of this alienation. He describes this alienation as stemming from the self-centered emphasis of capitalism, "where individuals act in their own self-interest, seeking the satisfaction of their own wants - man is not concerned with his fellow man, except insofar as he may be instrumental in satisfying his wants."

Pope Francis
 
Pope Francis has described mercy as "the very substance of the Gospel of Jesus" and asked theologians to reflect this in their work. Francis has taken the emphasis off of doctrinal purity or church membership and restored Jesus' emphasis on charity, on doing good as fundamental. Responding to the question whether atheists go to Heaven, Francis responded to an atheist: "We must meet one another doing good. 'But I don't believe, Father, I am an atheist!' But do good: we will meet one another there."

Pope Francis has accentuated the importance of mercy by declaring 2016 a "Year of Mercy." The pope made it clear that from 8 December 2015 to 20 November 2016, he wanted members of the Church "to place the sacrament of God’s mercy – which is the sacrament of penance and reconciliation – into the central pastoral life for the Church."

In his apostolic exhortation Evangelii gaudium, Francis said: "It is vital that government leaders and financial leaders take heed and broaden their horizons, working to ensure that all citizens have dignified work, education and healthcare." He explicitly affirmed "the right of states" to intervene in the economy to promote "the common good". He wrote:

Francis has warned about the "idolatry of money" and wrote:

In his second encyclical, Laudato si', the pope lays forth a "biting critique of consumerism and irresponsible development with a plea for swift and unified global action" to combat environmental degradation and climate change.

With respect to climate change, some critics have argued that Francis is departing from the positions of his predecessors. Daniel Schwindt observed that "some writers seem to suggest (as is common among persons who've never taken the time to read the encyclicals themselves), that Pope Francis' Laudato Si represents some new venture on the part of the Church—a departure from its customary range of subject matter." But, Schwindt argues, his attitude toward climate change is a precise continuation of the attitude of his immediate predecessor. Pope Benedict XVI once wrote:

Francis' apostolic exhortation Gaudete et exsultate emphasized the universal call to perfection of charity, which is based on "service of your brothers and sisters" (No. 14) and on the entirety of the Church's social teaching tradition.

Principles
Every commentator has his or her own list of key principles and documents, and there is no official 'canon' of principles or documents.

Human dignity
Human dignity is one principle of Catholic social thought. According to the Catechism of the Catholic Church, "Being in the image of God, the human individual possesses the dignity of a person, who is not just something, but someone. He is capable of self-knowledge, of self-possession facts, and of freely giving himself and entering into communion with other persons. And he is called by grace to a covenant with his Creator, to offer him a response of faith and love that no other creature can give."

Subsidiarity

The origins of subsidiarity as a concept of Catholic social thought lie with Wilhelm Emmanuel von Ketteler, who served as Bishop of Mainz in the mid- to late 19th century. It is most well-known, however, from its subsequent incorporation into Pope Pius XI's encyclical Quadragesimo anno. This encyclical's formulation of subsidiarity is the touchstone from which further interpretations tend to depart:
"Just as it is gravely wrong to take from individuals what they can accomplish by their own initiative and industry and give it to the community, so also it is an injustice and at the same time a grave evil and disturbance of right order to assign to a greater and higher association what lesser and subordinate organizations can do. For every social activity ought of its very nature to furnish help to the members of the body social, and never destroy and absorb them."
As with many social encyclicals in the modern period, this one occurs in the historical context of the intensifying struggle between communist and capitalist ideologies, exactly forty years – hence the title – after the Vatican's first public stance on the issue in Rerum novarum. Promulgated in 1931, Quadragesimo anno is a response to German Nazism and Soviet communism, on the one hand, and to Western European and American capitalist individualism on the other. It broke the surface of Catholic social teaching in this context, and it is helpful to keep this in mind. The main author of the 1931 encyclical's "subsidiarity" part was the German Jesuit and economist Oswald von Nell-Breuning.

Gregory Beabout suggests that subsidiarity draws upon a far older concept as well: the Roman military term subsidium. He writes that "the role of the subsidium (literally, to sit behind) is to lend help and support in case of need." Employing Beabout's etymology, subsidiarity indicates that the higher social unit ought to "sit behind" the lower ones to lend help and support in case of need. Another etymological interpretation states that subsidiarity literally means "to 'seat' ('sid') a service down ('sub') as close to the need for that service as is feasible". Either interpretation indicates a hermeneutic of subsidiarity in which the higher social body's rights and responsibilities for action are predicated upon their assistance to and empowerment of the lower.

Francis McHugh states that in addition to the "vertical" dimension of subsidiarity, there is also a "horizontal" dimension which "calls for a diversity of semi-autonomous social, economic, and cultural spheres". Quadragesimo anno presents these "spheres" as occupying the space between the poles of individual and State:
"...things have come to such a pass through the evil of what we have termed "individualism" that, following upon the overthrow and near extinction of that rich social life which was once highly developed through associations of various kinds, there remain virtually only individuals and the State. This is to the great harm of the State itself; for, with a structure of social governance lost, and with the taking over of all the burdens which the wrecked associations once bore. the State has been overwhelmed and crushed by almost infinite tasks and duties."
These associations or "lesser societies" are encouraged because they are the vehicle by which society functions most effectively and corresponds most closely with human dignity. Examples of these associations today would include the family, unions, nonprofit organizations, religious congregations, and corporations of all sizes.

Subsidiarity charts a course between the individualism and collectivism by locating the responsibilities and privileges of social life in the smallest unit of organization at which they will function. Larger social bodies, be they the state or otherwise, are permitted and required to intervene only when smaller ones cannot carry out the tasks themselves. Even in this case, the intervention must be temporary and for the purpose of empowering the smaller social body to be able to carry out such functions on its own.

Solidarity and the common good
Solidarity is a firm and persevering determination to commit oneself to the common good, not merely "vague compassion or shallow distress at the misfortunes of others" (Joseph Donders, John Paul II: The Encyclicals in Everyday Language). Solidarity, which flows from faith, is fundamental to the Christian view of social and political organization. Each person is connected to and dependent on all humanity, collectively and individually.

Charity
In Caritas in veritate, the Catholic Church declared that "Charity is at the heart of the Church". Every responsibility and every commitment spelt out by that doctrine is derived from charity which, according to the teaching of Jesus, is the synthesis of the entire Law (Matthew 22:36–40). It gives real substance to the personal relationship with God and with neighbour; it is the principle not only of micro-relationships but with friends, family members or within small groups.

The church has chosen the concept of "charity in truth" to avoid a degeneration into sentimentality in which love becomes empty. In a culture without truth, there is a fatal risk of losing love. It falls prey to contingent subjective emotions and opinions, the word love is abused and distorted, to the point where it comes to mean the opposite. Truth frees charity from the constraints of an emotionalism that deprives it of relational and social content, and of a fideism that deprives it of human and universal breathing-space. In the truth, charity reflects the personal yet public dimension of faith in God and the Bible.

Distributism and social justice

Distributism is a school of economic and social thought developed by Catholic thinkers G.K. Chesterton and Hilaire Belloc. It holds that social and economic structures should promote social justice, and that social justice is best served through a wide distribution of ownership. For support, distributists cite Rerum novarum, which states:

This principle is then used as a basis for progressive tax rates, anti-trust laws and economic cooperatives including credit unions. Rerum novarum, Quadragesimo anno and Centesimus annus are all documents which advocate a just distribution of income and wealth. Still more recently, in Caritas in veritate, Pope Benedict XVI emphasized the point to such an extent that the term "redistribution" is mentioned no less than eight times throughout the encyclical, each time in a positive manner.

Key themes
As with the principles above, there is no official list of key themes. The United States Conference of Catholic Bishops (USCCB) has identified these seven key themes of Catholic Social Teaching set out here. Other sources identify more or fewer key themes based on their reading of the key documents of the social magisterium.

Sanctity of human life and dignity of the person
The foundational principle of all Catholic social teachings is the sanctity of human life. Catholics believe in an inherent dignity of the human person starting from conception through to natural death. They believe that human life must be valued infinitely above material possessions. Pope John Paul II wrote and spoke extensively on the topic of the inviolability of human life and dignity in his watershed encyclical, Evangelium Vitae, (Latin for "The Gospel of Life").

Catholics oppose acts considered attacks and affronts to human life, including abortion, fornication (including contraception), capital punishment, euthanasia, genocide, torture, the direct and intentional targeting of noncombatants in war, and every deliberate taking of innocent human life. In the Second Vatican Council's Pastoral Constitution on the Church in the Modern World, Gaudium et spes (Latin for "Joy and Hope"), it is written that "from the moment of its conception life must be guarded with the greatest care." The church did not historically not oppose war in all circumstances. The church's moral theology has generally emphasized just war theory since the mid 3rd century. However, Francis' encyclical Fratelli Tutti says that in light of modern weapons of mass destruction, it is increasingly harder to invoke the criteria of a just war, and it calls for an end to war.
The post–Vatican II Catechism of the Catholic Church said of capital punishment:

Applying this argument to the situation in the United States today, in 2005 the USCCB launched "a major Catholic campaign to end the use of the death penalty."

In 2018, Pope Francis changed the Catechism to oppose all uses of the death penalty in the modern world, while not going so far as to call it intrinsically evil:Believing men and women are made in the image and likeness of God, Catholic doctrine teaches to respect all humans based on an inherent dignity. According to John Paul II, every human person "is called to a fullness of life which far exceeds the dimensions of his earthly existence, because it consists in sharing the very life of God." Catholics oppose racial prejudice and other forms of discrimination. In 2007 the USCCB wrote:

A belief in the inherent dignity of the human person also requires that basic human needs are adequately met, including food, health care, shelter, etc. The bishops have see this as a basis for the support of social welfare programs and of governmental economic policies that promote equitable distribution of income and access to essential goods and services.

Call to families, communities, and participation in the pursuit of the Common Good
According to the Book of Genesis, the Lord God said: "It is not good for the man to be alone". The Catholic Church teaches that man is both a sacred person and a social person and it also teaches that families are the first and most basic units of societies. It advocates a complementarian view of marriage, family life, and religious leadership. Full human development takes place in relationship to others. The family—based on marriage (between a man and a woman)—is the first and most fundamental unit of society and it is also a sanctuary for the creation and nurturing of children. Together families form communities, communities form states and together all across the world each human is part of the human family. How these communities organize themselves politically, economically and socially is thus of the highest importance. Each institution must be judged by how much it enhances, or is a detriment to, the life and dignity of human persons.

Catholic Social Teaching opposes collectivist approaches such as Communism but at the same time it also rejects unrestricted laissez-faire policies and the notion that a free market automatically produces social justice. The state has a positive moral role to play as no society will achieve a just and equitable distribution of resources with a totally free market. All people have a right to participate in the economic, political, and cultural life of society and, under the principle of subsidiarity, state functions should be carried out at the lowest level that is practical. A particular contribution of Catholic social teaching is a strong appreciation for the role of intermediary organizations such as labor unions, community organizations, fraternal groups and parish churches.

Rights and responsibilities; social justice

Every person has a fundamental right to life and to the necessities of life. The right to exercise religious freedom publicly and privately by individuals and institutions along with freedom of conscience need to be constantly defended. In a fundamental way, the right to free expression of religious beliefs protects all other rights.

The church supports private property and teaches that "every man has by nature the right to possess property as his own." The right to private property is not absolute, however, and is limited by the concepts of the "universal destiny of the goods of the earth" and of the social mortgage. It is theoretically moral and just for its members to destroy property used in an evil way by others, or for the state to redistribute wealth from those who have unjustly hoarded it.

Corresponding to these rights are duties and responsibilities—to one another, to our families, and to the larger society. Rights should be understood and exercised in a moral framework rooted in the dignity of the human person and social justice. Those that have more have a greater responsibility to contribute to the common good than those who have less.

We live our lives by a subconscious philosophy of freedom and work. The encyclical Laborem exercens (1981) by Pope John Paul II, describes work as the essential key to the whole social question. The very beginning is an aspect of the human vocation. Work includes every form of action by which the world is transformed and shaped or even simply maintained by human beings. It is through work that we achieve fulfilment. So in order to fulfil ourselves we must cooperate and work together to create something good for all of us, a common good. What we call justice is that state of social harmony in which the actions of each person best serve the common good.

Freedom according to Natural Law is the empowerment of good. Being free we have responsibilities. With human relationships we have responsibilities towards each other. This is the basis of human rights. The Roman Catholic Bishops of England and Wales, in their document "The Common Good" (1996) stated that, "The study of the evolution of human rights shows that they all flow from the one fundamental right: the right to life. From this derives the right to a society which makes life more truly human: religious liberty, decent work, housing, health care, freedom of speech, education, and the right to raise and provide for a family" (section 37). Having the right to life must mean that everyone else has a responsibility towards me. To help sustain and develop my life. This gives me the right to whatever I need to accomplish without compromising the mission of others, and it lays on others the corresponding responsibility to help me. All justice is the power of God compensated solely in terms of individual relationships.

The Ten Commandments reflect the basic structure of the Natural Law insofar as it applies to humanity. The first three are the foundation for everything that follows: The Love of God, the Worship of God, the sanctity of God and the building of people around God. The other seven Commandments are to do with the love of humanity and describe the different ways in which we must serve the common good : Honour your father and mother, you shall not murder, you shall not commit adultery, you shall not steal, you shall not bear false witness against your neighbour, you shall not covet anything that belongs to your neighbour (Exodus 20:3–17). Our Lord Jesus Christ Summarized the Commandments with the New Commandment: "Love one another, as I have loved you" (John 13:34, 15:9–17). The mystery of Jesus is a mystery of love. Our relationship with God is not one of fear, of slavery or oppression; it is a relationship of serene trust born of a free choice motivated by love. Pope John Paul II stated that love is the fundamental and innate vocation of every human being. By his law God does not intend to coerce our will, but to set it free from everything that could compromise its authentic dignity and its full realization. (Pope John Paul II to government leaders, 5 November 2000.)

Human rights according to the Catechism of the Catholic Church

The Catechism of the Catholic Church explains that every person is equal to others and has human rights, and even lists various human rights. These include the right to
life,
vote,
heed one's conscience,
criticize those in authority,
civil disobedience,
enjoy the goods of the earth (food, water, etc.),
private property,
contribute to society,
self-defense,
regulate the production and sale of weapons,
discontinue medical procedures,
immigrate,
choose a job and state of life,
respect and good reputation,
privacy,
know and live by the truth,
educate one's children,
choose one's children's school,
freedom of religion,
and learn the Catholic faith.

According to the church, the fundamental human right is the right to life. Pope John Paul II explained in Evangelium Vitae: "...the first of the fundamental rights, the right to life...the fundamental right and source of all other rights which is the right to life, a right belonging to every individual."

Preferential option for the poor and vulnerable

Jesus taught that on the Day of Judgement God will ask what each of us did to help the poor and needy: "Amen, I say to you, whatever you did for one of these least brothers of mine, you did for me." This is reflected in the church's canon law, which states, "The Christian faithful are also obliged to promote social justice and, mindful of the precept of the Lord, to assist the poor from their own resources."

Through our words, prayers and deeds we must show solidarity with, and compassion for, the poor. When instituting public policy we must always keep the "preferential option for the poor" at the forefront of our minds. The moral test of any society is "how it treats its most vulnerable members. The poor have the most urgent moral claim on the conscience of the nation. We are called to look at public policy decisions in terms of how they affect the poor."

Pope Benedict XVI has taught that "love for widows and orphans, prisoners, and the sick and needy of every kind, is as essential as the ministry of the sacraments and preaching of the Gospel". This preferential option for the poor and vulnerable includes all who are marginalized in our nation and beyond—unborn children, persons with disabilities, the elderly and terminally ill, and victims of injustice and oppression.

Dignity of work
Society must pursue economic justice and the economy must serve people, not the other way around. Employers must not "look upon their work people as their bondsmen, but ... respect in every man his dignity as a person ennobled by Christian character." Employers contribute to the common good through the services or products they provide and by creating jobs that uphold the dignity and rights of workers.

Workers have a right to work, to earn a living wage, and to form trade unions to protect their interests. All workers have a right to productive work, to decent and fair wages, and to safe working conditions. Workers also have responsibilities—to provide a fair day's work for a fair day's pay, to treat employers and co-workers with respect, and to carry out their work in ways that contribute to the common good. Workers must "fully and faithfully" perform the work they have agreed to do.

In 1933, the Catholic Worker Movement was founded by Dorothy Day and Peter Maurin. It was committed to nonviolence, voluntary poverty, prayer, and hospitality for the marginalized and poorest in society. Today over 185 Catholic Worker communities continue to protest injustice, war, racial prejudice, and violence of all forms.

Solidarity and the universal destiny of the goods of the Earth
Pope John Paul II wrote in the 1987 encyclical Sollicitudo rei socialis, "Solidarity is undoubtedly a Christian virtue. It seeks to go beyond itself to total gratuity, forgiveness, and reconciliation. It leads to a new vision of the unity of humankind, a reflection of God's triune intimate life. ..." It is a unity that binds members of a group together.

All the peoples of the world belong to one human family. We must be our brother's keeper, though we may be separated by distance, language or culture. Jesus teaches that we must each love our neighbors as ourselves and in the parable of the Good Samaritan we see that our compassion should extend to all people. Solidarity includes the Scriptural call to welcome the stranger among us—including immigrants seeking work, a safe home, education for their children, and a decent life for their families.

Solidarity at the international level primarily concerns the Global South. For example, the church has habitually insisted that loans be forgiven on many occasions, particularly during Jubilee years. Charity to individuals or groups must be accompanied by transforming unjust political, economic and social structures.

The world and its goods were created for the use and benefit of all of God's creatures and any structures that impede the realization of this fundamental goal are not right. This concept ties in with those of Social Justice and of the limits to private property.

Care for God's creation
A Biblical vision of justice is much more comprehensive than civil equity; it encompasses right relationships between all members of God's creation. Stewardship of creation: The world's goods are available for humanity to use only under a "social mortgage" which carries with it the responsibility to protect the environment. The "goods of the earth" are gifts from God, and they are intended by God for the benefit of everyone. Man was given dominion over all creation as sustainer rather than as exploiter, and is commanded to be a good steward of the gifts God has given him. We cannot use and abuse the natural resources God has given us with a destructive consumer mentality.

Catholic Social Teaching recognizes that the poor are the most vulnerable to environmental impact and endure disproportional hardship when natural areas are exploited or damaged. US Bishops established an environmental justice program to assist parishes and dioceses who wanted to conduct education, outreach and advocacy about these issues. The US Conference of Catholic Bishops Environmental Justice Program (EJP) calls Catholics to a deeper respect for God's creation and engages parishes in activities that deal with environmental problems, particularly as they affect the poor.

Encyclicals and other official documents
 Rerum novarum (1891)
 Singulari Quadam (1912)
 Quadragesimo anno (1931)
 Mater et magistra (1961)
 Pacem in terris (1963)
 Dignitatis humanae (1965)
 Populorum progressio (1967)
 Humanae vitae (1968)
 Octogesima adveniens (1971)
 Laborem exercens (1981)
 Sollicitudo rei socialis (1987)
 Centesimus annus (1991)
 Evangelium vitae (1995)
 Compendium of the Social Doctrine of the Church (2004)
 Deus caritas est (2005)
 Caritas in veritate (2009)
 Evangelii gaudium (2013)
 Laudato si' (2015)
 Gaudete et exsultate (2018)
 Fratelli tutti (2020)

Catholic social teaching in action

The Holy See

Several organs of the Holy See are dedicated to social issues. The Pontifical Council for Justice and Peace is tasked with promoting "justice and peace in the world, in the light of the Gospel and of the social teaching of the Church." It works to clarify, expand upon, and develop new teachings in the areas of peace, justice, and human rights. The council also collaborates with local and international Catholic organizations working in those areas, and works with the social welfare organs of the United Nations, through the Secretariat of State. The Pontifical Council Cor Unum is the Holy See's primary organ devoted to charitable works. The council supervises the activities of Caritas Internationalis. It also operates the John Paul II Foundation for the Sahel and the Populorum Progressio Foundation. The Pontifical Academy of Social Sciences promotes the study and progress of social sciences. The academy works with various dicasteries, especially the Council for Justice and Peace, to contribute to the development of the church's social teachings.

The Holy See has established the World Movement of Christian Workers as the church's organization for working men and women to advance Catholic social initiatives.

Europe and the Americas

Christian democracy, a political movement in numerous European and Latin American countries, is significantly influenced by Catholic social teaching. It has influenced other political movements in varying degrees throughout the world.

The subsidiarity principle which originated in Rerum novarum was established in European Union law by the Treaty of Maastricht, signed on 7 February 1992 and entered into force on 1 November 1993. The present formulation is contained in Article 5 of the Treaty Establishing the European Community (consolidated version following the Treaty of Nice, which entered into force on 1 February 2003).

Progressio Ireland, a nongovernmental development organization based in Dublin, is also founded on the principles of Catholic social teaching. It works to achieve sustainable development the eradication of poverty in the world's underdeveloped nations.

Mondragon Cooperative Corporation, a cooperative based in Mondragón, Spain, was founded on the then extant principles of Catholic social teaching.

The International Movement of Catholic Professionals and Intellectuals, "Pax Romana", is another organization firmly based on Catholic Social Teaching principles. It is active in all continents, particularly Europe, the Americas, and Africa.

In the run up to the 2010 General Election, the Catholic Bishops Conference of England and Wales produced the booklet Choosing the Common Good in order to clarify the principals of Catholic Social Teaching.

United States

There is an important movement of Catholic social activism in the United States.

See also

Adolph Kolping
Catholic theology
Christian finance
Christian socialism
Christian theology
Fidesco International
Konrad Adenauer
Liberation theology
Political Catholicism
Social market economy
Social teachings of the papacy
Solidarism
Third Way
Ukraine prison ministry

Notes

References
 Curran, Charles E, (2002), Catholic Social Teaching: 1891–Present, Georgetown University Press, .
 Harald Jung: Soziale Marktwirtschaft und Weltliche Ordnung, EThD Bd. 21, Berlin 2009, 
Daniel Schwindt, (2015), Catholic Social Teaching: A New Synthesis (Rerum Novarum to Laudato Si), .
Williams, Thomas D, (2011), The World As It Could Be: Catholic Social Thought for a New Generation, .

External links
 Pope Leo XIII's Encyclical Rerum novarum
 "Centesimus Annus Pro Pontifice Foundation" – Vatican foundation established in 1993 to make Catholic Social Teaching more widely known and better understood.
 Catholic Social Teaching – Provides a comprehensive index of Papal teaching on Social Doctrine as well as articles by Catholic scholars.
 Sharing Catholic Social Teaching: Reflections of the U.S. Catholic Bishops 
 Compendium of the Social Doctrine of the Church
 http://www.caritas.org.au/cst Caritas Australia – Catholic Social Teaching and poverty reduction in aid and development work
 Catholic Social Teaching – OpenCourseWare from the University of Notre Dame
 VPlater project: modules on CST for on-line study from Newman University, UK
  – List of the social teachings.
 Solidarity: The Journal of Catholic Social Thought and Secular Ethics
 American Solidarity Party – New 3rd party influenced by Catholic Social Teaching

 
Social teaching
Social teaching
Social ethics